Neville Fields (born 21 November 1951) is a former Australian rules footballer who played with Essendon and South Melbourne in the Victorian Football League (VFL).

Fields was a left footed centreman and won Essendon's most improved player award in 1971. He was their best and fairest the following season and represented Victoria in interstate football. After struggling for form throughout 1977 he was traded to South Melbourne for Terry Daniher. In 1981 he returned to Essendon where he spent a further two seasons.

Fields's son Tom played two matches for Carlton Football Club in 2015.

References

External links

1951 births
Australian rules footballers from Victoria (Australia)
Essendon Football Club players
Sydney Swans players
Crichton Medal winners
Living people